McBurnie is a surname. Notable people with the surname include:

 Beryl McBurnie (1913–2000), Trinidadian dancer
 Oli McBurnie (born 1996), Scottish footballer
 Sophie "Piri" McBurnie (born 1999), one half of Piri & Tommy

See also
 McBurney (surname)
 McBurnie Coachcraft, an American bodywork company